Fahed Faisal Boodai (Arabic: فهد فيصل بودي) is a Kuwaiti entrepreneur. He is the chairman and co-founder of Gatehouse Financial Group as well as the CEO of The Securities House.

Education

Boodai received an MBA from the Loyola Marymount University in Los Angeles, and a bachelor's degree in International Business from the University of San Diego.

War service 
Iraq invaded Kuwait in 1990, when Boodai was 17. He joined the Kuwait armed forces in exile, and underwent basic training. Drawing on his fluency in English and Arabic, he went on to work with the US military as a translator.

He was posted to military intelligence with the 18th Airborne Corps operating on the northern border of Saudi Arabia.

After Kuwait was liberated by US-led coalition forces, he was given an officer rank and helped the US Army's host nation affairs unit foster relations with the Kuwaiti population.

Boodai was awarded the US Army Commendation Medal for meritorious service to the US Army during Operation Desert Storm and the liberation of Kuwait.

References

Kuwaiti businesspeople
Kuwaiti investment bankers
Loyola Marymount University alumni
University of San Diego alumni
Living people
20th-century Kuwaiti businesspeople
21st-century Kuwaiti businesspeople
Year of birth missing (living people)